Dhoki is a major village in Osmanabad taluka of Osmanabad district in the Indian state of Maharashtra. In 2011, village had population of 15,303 with literacy rate of 82% and average sex ratio of 936. Village has Primary Health Centre.

References

Villages in Osmanabad district